The Gulf sturgeon (Acipenser oxyrinchus desotoi) is a subspecies of sturgeon that lives in the Gulf of Mexico and some rivers draining into it.  The Gulf sturgeon was first recognized as a separate subspecies in 1955.  The nominate subspecies is the Atlantic sturgeon, A. o. oxyrinchus.  The Gulf sturgeon is listed as threatened under the United States Endangered Species Act, having been listed in 1991.  Critical habitat, reflecting the current range of the subspecies, has been designated (see map).  The historical range is thought to have been from the Suwannee River on the western coast of Florida  to the Mississippi River, and marine waters of the central and eastern portions of the Gulf of Mexico.  Three sturgeon species in genus Scaphirhynchus share river territory with the Gulf sturgeon; none of these is anadromous.

Physical appearance 
Visually, Gulf sturgeon are almost impossible to differentiate from Atlantic sturgeon, as the most significant morphological difference is the spleen length, which is internal.  Gulf sturgeon have a spleen length averaging 12.3% of their fork length, while Atlantic sturgeon have a spleen length averaging 5.7% of their fork length. Lesser morphological differences include relative head length, shape of dorsal scutes, and pectoral fin length.  Genetic differences between the subspecies have been studied, and tend to indicate reproductive isolation occurred in the Pleistocene period.  Behavioral differences are more clear, especially the dietary habits.  Adult Gulf sturgeon eat primarily, or possibly only, during the winter, when they are in marine or brackish water, and eat little to nothing during the remainder of the year when they are in rivers.   Their weights vary in accordance with this eating pattern, with significant weight gains in the winter and smaller weight losses in the summer.  Because their diet consists of mollusks that can cause paralytic shellfish poisoning (PSP), in addition to other bottom-dwelling organisms such as grass shrimp, marine worms, isopods, and amphipods, their unique feeding pattern possibly reflects an adaptation to prevent PSP that coincides with higher rates of algal blooms in summer.

Lifecycle 
Juvenile Gulf sturgeon remain in the spawning river until roughly two years of age, eating there.  Thereafter, they join the adults in their anadromous migrations and eating habits.  The upriver migration normally occurs between February and April, as river temperatures rise to 16 to 23 °C.  Downriver migration normally begins in late September or October when water temperatures drop to 23 °C.  Males reach sexual maturity between seven and 12 years of age, females between eight and 17 years of age.  Spawning almost always occurs in the natal river, generally over a hard bottom just downstream of a spring on the river bottom feeding groundwater into the river.  After spawning, the adults and older juveniles collect in regions of cooler, deeper, slower-flowing water, generally downstream of springs.

Jumping 
All species of sturgeon leap out of the water at times.  The Gulf sturgeon tends to jump during July and August, and again early during the offshore feeding period.  They are thought to jump to communicate and maintain group cohesion. Due to their heavy body armor, large leaping sturgeon can inflict serious injuries to humans who are in the way. On July 2, 2015, a leaping sturgeon on the Suwannee River in Florida struck and killed a 5-year-old girl.

Population controls 
Predators of the sturgeon, other than humans, are unknown, but thought to have limited impact upon the species. Parasites include the fish louse Argulus stizostehi, nematodes, trematodes, and leeches. No detrimental impacts from these parasites have been observed. The species also serves as host to the glochidia (larvae) of three freshwater mussel species. Overfishing and dam construction probably contributed to the historical decline in populations.

References

External links
NOAA Fisheries gulf sturgeon web page

Acipenser
Fish of the United States
Fish described in 1955
ESA threatened species